Jim Carlin (born October 19, 1962) is an American attorney and politician serving as the Iowa State Senator from the 3rd district since 2017. A member of the Republican Party, he won a special election against challenger Todd Wendt following the resignation of incumbent Bill Anderson. Carlin was a candidate for the Republican nomination in the 2022 United States Senate election in Iowa.

Early life and education 
Carlin was born in Pittsfield, Massachusetts. He earned a Bachelor of Arts degree in economics from the University of Massachusetts Amherst and a Juris Doctor from the Marquette University Law School.

Career 
Carlin served in the United States Army from 1983 to 1985. After moving to northwest Iowa, he founded the Carlin Law Office, where he specializes in malpractice and injury litigation. He was a member of the Iowa House of Representatives in 2017, having represented the 6th district after previous incumbent Ron Jorgensen retired. Later that year, he was elected to the Iowa Senate.

Following the 2020 presidential election, Carlin supported unfounded conspiracy theories that Democrats stole the election. After President Donald Trump refused to concede, Carlin made claims of fraud. Carlin said, "Who believes that Joe Biden got 12 million more votes than Barack Obama on his best day? I don't." In 2021, Carlin proposed that universities would catalogue the political affiliations of faculty.

In February 2021, Carlin announced his candidacy for the Republican nomination in the 2022 United States Senate election in Iowa. During his campaign, Carlin criticized incumbent Chuck Grassley for voting to certify the 2020 election results.

Personal life 
He currently resides in Sioux City, Iowa with his wife Donna and their three children.

See also
 Attempts to overturn the 2020 United States presidential election
 Republican efforts to make voting laws more restrictive following the 2020 presidential election

References

External links
 Jim Carlin at Iowa Legislature
 
 Biography at Ballotpedia
 Campaign Website

1962 births
Candidates in the 2022 United States Senate elections
Living people
University of Massachusetts Amherst alumni
Marquette University Law School alumni
Republican Party members of the Iowa House of Representatives
21st-century American politicians
People from Pittsfield, Massachusetts